The South African cricket team toured England in the 1935 season to play a five-match Test series against England.

South Africa won the series 1–0 with 4 matches drawn. Their victory at Lord's was their first in a Test in England, and with the remaining matches drawn, it also ensured that they would, for the first time, win a series in England. In all first-class matches, they won 17, drew 12, and lost only two.

Test series summary

First Test
{{Two-innings cricket match
| date = 15–18 June 1935 (3-day match)
| team1 = 
| team2 = 

| score-team1-inns1 = 384/7d (132 overs)
| runs-team1-inns1 = RES Wyatt 149
| wickets-team1-inns1 = CL Vincent 3/101 (43 overs)

| score-team2-inns1 = 220 (116.5 overs)
| runs-team2-inns1 = IJ Siedle 59
| wickets-team2-inns1 = MS Nichols 6/35 (23.5 overs)

| score-team1-inns2 = 
| runs-team1-inns2 = 
| wickets-team1-inns2 =

| score-team2-inns2 = 17/1 (f/o) (9 overs)
| runs-team2-inns2 = B Mitchell 8*
| wickets-team2-inns2 = MS Nichols 1/14 (5 overs)

| result = Match drawn
| report = Scorecard
| venue = Trent Bridge, Nottingham
| umpires = A Dolphin and J Hardstaff
| toss = England won the toss and elected to bat.
| rain = 	16 June was taken as a rest day.There was no play on the final day.| notes = NS Mitchell-Innes (ENG), and EAB Rowan, AD Nourse, HF Wade, DS Tomlinson, ACB Langton and RJ Crisp (all SA) made their Test debuts.
}}

Second Test

Third Test

Fourth Test

Fifth Test

References

Annual reviews
 Wisden Cricketers' Almanack 1936

Further reading
 Brian Bassano and Rick Smith, Maiden Victory, J. W. McKenzie, London, 2013  
 Bill Frindall, The Wisden Book of Test Cricket 1877-1978'', Wisden, 1979

External links
 South Africa in England, 1935 at Cricinfo
 South Africa to England 1935 at Test Cricket Tours 
 South Africa in British Isles 1935 at CricketArchive
 Ten of the team introduced on a British Pathe newsreel

1935 in English cricket
1935 in South African cricket
English cricket seasons in the 20th century
International cricket competitions from 1918–19 to 1945
1935